Then We'll Get a Divorce (Italian: Dopo divorzieremo) is a 1940 Italian "white-telephones" comedy film directed by Nunzio Malasomma and starring Amedeo Nazzari, Vivi Gioi and Lia Orlandini.

The film's sets were designed by the art director Piero Filippone. It was shot at the Palatino Studios in Rome. A separate Spanish-language version El marido provisional was also produced by the same director with a different cast.

Cast

References

Bibliography 
 Gundle, Stephen. Mussolini's Dream Factory: Film Stardom in Fascist Italy. Berghahn Books, 2013.

External links 
 

1940 films
Italian comedy films
1940 comedy films
1940s Italian-language films
Films directed by Nunzio Malasomma
Italian black-and-white films
Minerva Film films
Films shot at Palatino Studios
1940s Italian films